Burton Court is a grade II listed, large country house near Linton, Penyard, Herefordshire, England.

The house is of brick-faced stone, with five bays.  Three bays have lunette windows and a steep pediment.  Within the pediment is a diocletian window.

It was built in the 18th century and was owned by the Huntley Family of Boxwell Court, Gloucestershire until 2010.

References

Country houses in Herefordshire
Grade II listed buildings in Herefordshire